Mahmudabad-e Alam Khani (also Romanized as Maḩmūdābād-e ‘Alam Khānī; also known as Maḩmūdābād) is a village in Eqbal-e Gharbi Rural District, in the Central District of Qazvin County, Qazvin Province, Iran. At the 2006 census, its population was 1,163, in 264 families.

References 

Populated places in Qazvin County